Hanne Hiob (12 March 1923 – 23 June 2009) was a German actress.

Life and career

Hiob was born as Hanne Marianne Brecht in Munich, the daughter of the writer Bertolt Brecht by his wife, opera singer and actress Marianne Zoff (1893-1984).  In February 1928, Zoff had a daughter, Ursula Lingen, by German actor Theo Lingen. In September 1928, Brecht and Zoff divorced; Zoff married Lingen later that year. Hanne Brecht later married Joachim Hiob.

Hanne grew up with her mother and Theo Lingen, and Lingen was able to protect his wife, who was classified as a half-Jew under the Nazi-regime, and his daughter from persecution.

Hanne Brecht studied dance at the Vienna State Opera and worked as a dancer and an actress in Salzburg, Austria. Among other parts, she played the leading role in Brecht's Señora Carrar's Rifles and in 1959 in Saint Joan of the Stockyards under the direction of Gustaf Gründgens. She performed in Munich, Hamburg, Frankfurt, Vienna and Berlin.

She retired from the stage in 1976 but remained active reading Brecht works and participating in street theater projects such as the Anachronistic Train. Hiob received the Aachen Peace Prize in 2005.

Death
Hanne Hiob died in Munich, aged 86, from undisclosed causes.

Filmography

Actress
 Hundert Jahre Brecht (A hundred years of Brecht) (1997) 	
 Die letzte Runde (The last round) (1983)
 Raindrops (1980/1981)
 Die Ermittlung (The investigation) (by Peter Weiss) (1966)
 Es fing so harmlos an (It began so innocently) (1943/1944) 	
  (Mrs. Luna) (1941)

Director
 Flüchtlingsgespräche (2003)

Literature
Hanne Hiob, Gerd Koller (ed.) Wir verreisen...in die Vernichtung; Briefe 1937–1944, Aufbau Taschenbuch Verlag Berlin (1998),

References

External links

Genealogy

"Hanne Hiob, Brecht’s Acting Kin, Dies at 86", Associated Press / The New York Times, 25 June 2009

1923 births
2009 deaths
German film actresses
20th-century German Jews
German stage actresses
Actresses from Munich
20th-century German actresses
Family of Bertolt Brecht